The Campeonato de Fútbol Femenino de Primera División B, also known as the Segunda División Femenina, is the second-highest division of women's football in Argentina.

It was established in 2016, after the Argentine Football Association decided to separate the Campeonato de Fútbol Femenino into two divisions, based on the final results in the 2015 season. The creation of the second division allowed more teams to enter Primera División B. Since the 2018-19 season, the worst-placed teams have been relegated to the Primera División C, the third division.

History

2016
The first season began on 3 April 2016 with 14 teams that added the debuting teams and the teams that had descended from the Primera División in the 2015 season. These clubs were Almagro, Atlanta, Bella Vista (Córdoba), Defensores Unidos, Defensores del Chaco, Deportivo Morón, Excursionistas, Hebraica, El Porvenir, Liniers, Lujan, Villa San Carlos, Leandro N. Alem and Fernando Cáceres FC, although Bella Vista and Leandro N. Alem left before starting the season while Almagro did during it. The season was a round trip of everyone against everyone. On 25 September, Villa San Carlos was proclaimed champion and were promoted to Primera División A while El Porvenir and Atlanta, which finished second and third respectively, were also promoted.

Champions

Titles by club

Notes

References

2016 establishments in Argentina
Football leagues in Argentina
Sports leagues established in 2016
Argentina 2
Women's football in Argentina
Women's sports leagues in Argentina